Mildred Pierce is a 1945 American melodrama/film noir directed by Michael Curtiz and starring Joan Crawford, Jack Carson, and Zachary Scott, also featuring Eve Arden, Ann Blyth, and Bruce Bennett. Based on the 1941 novel by James M. Cain, this was Crawford's first starring role for Warner Bros., after leaving Metro-Goldwyn-Mayer, and she won the Academy Award for Best Actress.

In 1996, Mildred Pierce was deemed "culturally, historically, or aesthetically significant" and selected for preservation in the United States Library of Congress National Film Registry.

Plot

Monte Beragon, the second husband of Mildred Pierce, is murdered. The police tell Mildred her first husband, Bert Pierce, has confessed. Mildred protests that he is too kind to commit murder and reveals her story to the officer in flashback.

Mildred and Bert are unhappily married. After Bert splits with his business partner, Wally Fay, Mildred must sell her baked goods to support the family. Bert accuses Mildred of favoring their two daughters over him. Their quarrel intensifies after a phone call from Bert's mistress, Maggie Biederhof, and they separate.

Mildred retains custody of 16-year-old Veda, a bratty social climber, and 10-year-old Kay, a tomboy. Mildred's principal goal is to provide material possessions for Veda, who longs for high social status and is ashamed of her mother being a baker. Mildred hides her other job as a waitress, but Veda learns the truth and treats her mother with disdain.

Mildred meets Monte Beragon, a Pasadena society playboy with an almost-depleted inheritance. Beragon owns the building that Mildred wants to purchase for a restaurant, and he pursues a romantic interest in her. While the two are at his beach house for a weekend, Kay contracts pneumonia and dies after a trip to Lake Arrowhead with Veda and Bert. Mildred channels her grief into work and throws herself into opening a new restaurant. With help from her friend and former supervisor, Ida Corwin, Mildred's restaurant is successful. Wally helps Mildred buy the property, and soon she owns a chain of restaurants throughout Southern California.

Veda secretly marries well-to-do Ted Forrester for his money and position, but his mother objects. Veda agrees to dissolve the marriage but claims she is pregnant and demands $10,000 from the Forresters. Veda smugly confesses her pregnancy is a sham to Mildred, who tears up the check and throws her out of the house.

Bert, too distraught to tell Mildred about Veda's latest escapade, takes her to Wally's nightclub, where Veda performs as a lounge singer. After seeing several sailors in the audience wolf-whistle at Veda in her sexy costume, Mildred begs her to come home. Veda sneers and says her mother can never give her the lifestyle she deserves.

Desperate to reconcile with her daughter, Mildred coaxes Monte into a loveless marriage to improve her social status, with Monte's price being a one-third share of her business to allow him to settle his debts. Veda, eager to live out her dream as a debutante, pretends to reconcile with her mother and moves into Beragon's lavish mansion.

Eventually, the cost of supporting Monte and Veda's affluent lifestyles—and Monte's underhanded ploy to retain his share in the business while causing his wife to forfeit her own—bankrupts Mildred, forcing her to sell the restaurant chain. After driving to his beach house to confront Monte, Mildred finds Veda in his arms. Veda scornfully tells her mother that Monte intends to marry her after divorcing Mildred, who runs to her car in tears after dropping a gun she intended to use on Monte. When Monte tells Veda he would never marry her because she is a "rotten little tramp", she shoots him with Mildred's gun.

Veda begs her mother to help conceal the murder; Mildred reluctantly agrees. Fed up with his misdeeds—helping Veda blackmail the Forresters, hiring her to sing in his seedy nightclub, assenting to Monte's business move against her, and making constant sexual overtures toward her—Mildred tries to pin the murder on Wally by luring him to the beach house. Police officers arrest Wally when he flees in panic after seeing Monte's body. Still, the investigating officer tells Mildred that Wally cannot be the killer because he has no motive.

In the present, the detectives admit they knew all along that Veda committed the murder. Mildred tries to apologize as her daughter is sent to jail, but Veda rebuffs her. Mildred leaves the police station to find Bert waiting for her outside.

Cast

Comparison to the novel
Although James M. Cain was often labeled a "hard-boiled crime writer", his novel Mildred Pierce (1941) was mostly a psychological work, with little violence. The adaptation, released four years later, was designed as a thriller, and a murder was introduced into the plot.

The novel spans nine years (from 1931 to 1940), whereas the film is set from 1939 to the 1940s and spans only four years. Its characters do not age as a consequence. Mildred's physical appearance does not change, although her costumes become more elegant as her business grows. Veda ages from around 13 to 17. Mildred is more of a tycoon in the film; her restaurants are glamorous places, and she owns a whole chain (Mildred's) instead of the novel's three. Evil, spoiled Veda, who is prodigiously talented and brilliantly devious in the novel, is somewhat less formidable in the film. All references to the Depression and the Prohibition era, which are important in the novel, are absent from the screenplay.

The plot is simplified and the number of characters reduced. Veda's training and success as a singer (including her performance at the Hollywood Bowl) were dropped in the film and her music teachers only mentioned in passing. Lucy Gessler, a key character in the novel and Mildred's good friend, is eliminated. Ida, Mildred's boss at the restaurant where she works as a waitress, is given much of Gessler's wise-cracking personality.

Monte does not die in the novel, and Veda never goes to jail. The murder portion of the story was invented by the filmmakers because the censorship code of that time required evildoers to be punished for their misdeeds. The 2011 HBO miniseries Mildred Pierce follows the novel more faithfully in this respect.

Production
The working title for Mildred Pierce was House on the Sand; and filming began on December 7, 1944. Ralph Bellamy, Donald Woods, and George Coulouris were considered for the role of Bert, while Bonita Granville, Virginia Weidler, and Martha Vickers were considered for Veda. Scenes for the film were shot in Glendale and Malibu, California. Permission had to be granted from the U.S. Navy to shoot in Malibu because of wartime restrictions.

In 1942, two years earlier, Joan Crawford had been released from Metro-Goldwyn-Mayer due to a mutual agreement. Crawford campaigned for the lead role in Mildred Pierce, which most lead actresses did not want because of the implied age as mother of a teenage daughter. Warner Bros. and director Michael Curtiz originally wanted Bette Davis to play the title role, but she declined. Curtiz did not want Crawford to play the part. He campaigned for Barbara Stanwyck, who was working on My Reputation (1946) at the time. When he learned that Stanwyck was not going to be cast, he then tried to recruit either Olivia de Havilland or Joan Fontaine to play Mildred, but both were still in their 20s. He ultimately approved Crawford's casting after seeing her screen test. Even so, Curtiz and Crawford were often at odds on the set, with producer Jerry Wald acting as peacemaker.

Reception

Box office
The film was a box-office success. According to Warner Bros., it earned $3,483,000 in the United States and $2,155,000 in other markets.

Critical response

Contemporary reviews praised Crawford's performance but had mixed opinions about other aspects of the film. A review in The New York Times stated that, although Crawford gave "a sincere and generally effective characterization", the film "lacks the driving force of stimulating drama", and it did "not seem reasonable that a level-headed person like Mildred Pierce, who builds a fabulously successful chain of restaurants on practically nothing, could be so completely dominated by a selfish and grasping daughter, who spells trouble in capital letters."

William Brogdon of Variety liked the film, especially the screenplay, and wrote:At first reading James M. Cain's novel of the same title might not suggest screenable material, but the cleanup job has resulted in a class feature, showmanly produced by Jerry Wald and tellingly directed by Michael Curtiz ... The dramatics are heavy but so skillfully handled that they never cloy. Joan Crawford reaches a peak of her acting career in this pic. Ann Blyth, as the daughter, scores dramatically in her first genuine acting assignment. Zachary Scott makes the most of his character as the Pasadena heel, a talented performance.

Harrison's Reports wrote that Crawford delivered a "good performance", but the story "lacks conviction, and the main characterizations are overdrawn. For example, the daughter's hatred for her mother has no logical basis, consequently, it weakens the story."

John McCarten of The New Yorker wrote:Certainly, despite its unconscionable length—it takes almost two hours—Mildred Pierce contains enough excitement to jolt even the most lethargic customer...it is pleasant to report that Miss Crawford is no longer as frantic in appearance as she once was. Despite all kinds of chances to go berserk as a Cain mother, Miss Crawford remains subdued and reasonable, like most of the rest of a highly competent cast.

In a 2005 review, Jeremiah Kipp of Slant Magazine gave the film a mixed review:Mildred Pierce is melodramatic trash, constructed like a reliable Aristotelian warhorse where characters have planted the seeds of their own doom in the first act, only to have grief-stricken revelations at the climax. Directed by studio favorite Michael Curtiz in German Expressionistic mode, which doesn't quite go with the California beaches and sunlight but sets the bleak tone of domestic film noir, and scored by Max Steiner with a sensational bombast that's rousing even when it doesn't match the quieter, pensive mood of individual scenes, Mildred Pierce is professionally executed and moves at a brisk clip.

In 1978, historian June Sochen argued the film lies at the intersection of the "weepie" and "independent woman" genres of the 1930s and 1940s. It accentuates common ground of the two: Women must be submissive, live through others, and remain in the home.

On the review aggregator website Rotten Tomatoes, the film holds an approval rating of 87% based on 46 reviews, with an average rating of 8.1/10. The website's critics consensus reads, "Tied together by a powerhouse performance from Joan Crawford, Mildred Pierce blends noir and social drama to soapily intoxicating effect.".

Accolades

American Film Institute lists
 AFI's 100 Years ... 100 Heroes and Villains:
 Veda Pierce – Nominated Villain
 AFI's 100 Years ... 100 Movie Quotes:
 "Personally, Veda's convinced me that alligators have the right idea. They eat their young." – Nominated
 AFI's 100 Years ... 100 Movies (10th Anniversary Edition) – Nominated

Adaptations
A five-part television miniseries of Mildred Pierce premiered on HBO in March 2011, starring Kate Winslet as Mildred, Guy Pearce as Beragon, Evan Rachel Wood as Veda, and Mare Winningham as Ida. Separate actresses portray Veda at different ages, as opposed to Ann Blyth alone in the 1945 film. Wally Fay's character in the original has been changed back to the novel's Wally Burgan, and is portrayed by James LeGros. The cast also includes Melissa Leo as Mildred's neighbor and friend, Lucy Gessler, a character omitted from the Crawford version. The film is told in chronological order with no flashbacks or voice-over narration, and eliminates the murder subplot that was added for the 1945 version.

Mildred Pierce in popular culture

In films
The 1981 film Mommie Dearest mentions the screen test Crawford (played by Faye Dunaway) must endure, a rehearsal scene at her home for the film, a portrayal of her at home during the Academy Awards radio broadcast announcing the 1945 winners, and her acceptance speech outside her home for a team of reporters.

In television
In 1976, the ninth episode of the tenth season of The Carol Burnett Show featured a take-off of the film called "Mildred Fierce", with Carol Burnett as Mildred, Vicki Lawrence as Veda, and Harvey Korman as Monte.

In the third episode of The Deuce, "The Principle Is All", Darlene watches Mildred Pierce with one of her regulars.

In music
The eighth track on the 1990 album Goo by alternative rock band Sonic Youth is an instrumental titled "Mildred Pierce".

Other
The Gainesville, Florida, restaurant Mildred's Big City Food is named after the film's title character.

Home media
Mildred Pierce is available on Region 2 DVD in a single disc edition which includes an 86-minute documentary about the career and personal life of Joan Crawford. The documentary features contributions from fellow actors and directors, including Diane Baker, Betsy Palmer, Anna Lee, Anita Page, Cliff Robertson, Virginia Grey, Dickie Moore, Norma Shearer, Ben Cooper, Margaret O'Brien, Judy Geeson, and Vincent Sherman. Mildred Pierce is also included in a Region 2 signature collection of Crawford's films with Possessed, Grand Hotel, The Damned Don't Cry, and Humoresque.

The Region 1 edition is a flipper single disc with "Joan Crawford: The Ultimate Movie Star" documentary and a series of trailer galleries on the reverse of the film.

Mildred Pierce is available on DVD and Blu-ray from The Criterion Collection for Regions 1 and 2 in a special edition which includes a host of special features, including "Joan Crawford: The Ultimate Movie Star", a 2002 feature-length documentary, a Q&A with actor Ann Blyth from 2006, a conversation on the film between critics Molly Haskell and Robert Polito, an excerpt from The David Frost Show featuring Joan Crawford, a booklet with an essay by critic Imogen Sara Smith, and more.

It was released on 4K UHD on March 7, 2023 by Criterion.

References

Further reading

External links

 
 
 
 
 
 Mildred Pierce: A Woman’s Work – an essay by Imogen Sara Smith at The Criterion Collection
 Mildred Pierce essay by Charlie Achuff on the National Film Registry website

Streaming audio
 Mildred Pierce on Lux Radio Theater: June 6, 1949
 Mildred Pierce on Lux Radio Theater: June 14, 1954

1945 films
1945 crime drama films
1940s American films
1940s English-language films
American crime drama films
American black-and-white films
Film noir
Films about businesspeople
Films about mother–daughter relationships
Films about murder
Films about social class
Films based on American crime novels
Films based on American thriller novels
Films based on works by James M. Cain
Films directed by Michael Curtiz
Films featuring a Best Actress Academy Award-winning performance
Films produced by Jerry Wald
Films scored by Max Steiner
Films set in Los Angeles
Films shot in Los Angeles County, California
Films with screenplays by Ranald MacDougall
United States National Film Registry films
Warner Bros. films